The Blitz is the eighth studio album by the Swiss hard rock band Krokus, released in August 1984. It became a gold album in the United States. The band hit the Billboard Hot 100 with "Midnite Maniac" from that album and became the first Swiss act to do so. While preparing to record it, the group had tapped Patrick Mahassen to join the band on guitar, with Mark Kohler switching to bass. However, Mahassen would end up leaving the band before recording commenced, and the album was ultimately recorded as a quartet; Andy Tanas played bass on the subsequent tour. The song "Boys Nite Out", written by Bryan Adams and Jim Vallance, was originally recorded by Adams for his hit 1984 album Reckless but was left off the final track list. Adams' version eventually saw a release on the 30th anniversary reissue of Reckless.

UK-based company Rock Candy Records reissued the album on CD in 2014.

In pop culture 
A cover of Krokus' version of "Ballroom Blitz", originally performed by UK band Sweet, is featured as a playable track on Guitar Hero Encore: Rocks the 80s.

Track listing

Personnel 
Krokus
Marc Storace – vocals
Fernando von Arb – lead guitar, rhythm guitar
Mark Kohler – bass
Jeff Klaven – drums, percussion

Additional musicians
Doug Johnson - keyboards
Jimi Jamison – backing vocals in "Our Love"

Production
Bruce Fairbairn – producer
Bob Rock, Bob Ketchum – engineers
Mike Fraser – assistant engineer 
Phil Burnett – mixing
George Marino – mastering

Charts

Album

Singles

Certifications

References 

Krokus (band) albums
1984 albums
Albums produced by Bruce Fairbairn
Arista Records albums
Glam metal albums